Marcin Wodziński (born 30 May 1966) is a professor of Jewish Studies at University of Wrocław in Wrocław, Poland, where he heads the University's Department of Jewish Studies. Wodziński previously worked as the chief historian for the Museum of the History of Polish Jews in Warsaw.

Wodziński is from the city of Świdnica in south-west Poland. Wodziński, who is not Jewish, has studied the development of Hasidism generally, and in Poland specifically, and considers Hasidism "one of the most important religious phenomena to historically develop in Poland."

Research on contemporary Hasidim
Wodziński is the first academic to conduct a comprehensive study on contemporary Hasidim. Wodziński's methodology included reading through all Hasidic community phone directories to arrive at an approximate figure for the global community as well as indicators for trends within the Hasidism today. Wodziński found that there are between 700,000 and 750,000 Hasidim in the world today, with some 41% living in the US and 48% living in Israel.

Wodziński's 2018 book Historical Atlas of Hasidism was awarded the 2018 National Jewish Book Award for Scholarship.

Books
 Jews in Silesia (2001)
 Haskalah and Hasidism in the Kingdom of Poland: A History of Conflict (Oxford, 2005)
 Hasidism and Politics: The Kingdom of Poland, 1815--1864 (2011)
 Historical Atlas of Hasidism (2018)

See also
 Heinrich Graetz
 Simon Dubnow
 Salo W. Baron

References

External links
 

20th-century Polish historians
Polish male non-fiction writers
Living people
Academic staff of the University of Wrocław
Historians of Jews and Judaism
People from Świdnica
1966 births
21st-century Polish historians